Anjana Saikia (born 18 November 1993) is an Indian international footballer who plays as a goalkeeper for Gokulam Kerala FC. She has been a member of the India women's national team.

Honours

India
 SAFF Women's Championship: 2014

Gokulam Kerala
Indian Women's League: 2019–20

References

1993 births
People from Dibrugarh district
Footballers from Assam
Living people
India women's international footballers
Indian women's footballers
Sportswomen from Assam
Women's association football goalkeepers
Gokulam Kerala FC Women players
Indian Women's League players